This article lists various statistics related to Juventud Independiente.

All stats accurate as of 17 December 2014.

Honours
As of 6 February 2015 Juventud Independiente have won 2 Segunda División trophies.

Domestic competitions

League
Segunda División de El Salvador
Winners (2):  2008 Clausura, 2011 Clausura

Cup

CONCACAF competitions

Official titles

Individual awards

Award winners
Top Goalscorer (1)
The following players have won the Goalscorer while playing for Santa Tecla:
 Jesús Toscanini (13)  – Apertura 2013

Goalscorers 
Most goals scored : 29 - Irvin Valdez
Most League goals: 29 -  Irvin Valdez
Most League goals in a season: 14 - Jesús Toscanini, Primera Division, Apertura 2013
Most goals scored by a Juventud player in a match:
Most goals scored by a Juventud player in an International match:
Most goals scored in CONCACAF competition:

All-time top goalscorers 

Note: Players in bold text are still active with Santa Tecla F.C.

Historical goals

Players

Appearances

Other appearances records
 Youngest first-team player:
 Oldest first-team player:
 Most appearances in Primera Division:
 Most appearances in International competitions: 
 Most appearances in CONCACAF competitions: 
 Most appearances in CONCACAF Champions League:
 Most appearances as a foreign player in all competitions: 
 Most appearances as a foreign player in Primera Division:
 Most consecutive League appearances:
 Shortest appearance: –

Records

Scorelines
Record League victory: 6–0 v  Alianza, Primera division, 27 October 2013
Record League Defeat: 0-10 v  C.D. Aguila, Primera division, August 24, 2008
Record Cup victory: 
Record CONCACAF Champions League Victory:
Record CONCACAF Champions League Defeat:

Sequences
Most wins in a row:
Most home wins in a row (all competitions): 
Most home league wins in a row:
Most away wins in a row:
Most draws in a row:
Most home draws in a row:
Most away draws in a row:
Most defeats in a row:
Most home defeats in a row:
Most away defeats in a row:
Longest unbeaten run: 18, 2003 Season
Longest unbeaten run at home:
Longest unbeaten run away:
Longest winless run:
Longest winless run at home:
Longest winless run away:

Seasonal
Most goals in all competitions in a season: 40 goals - Apertura 2013
Most League goals scored in a season (Apertura/Clausura): 40 goals - Apertura 2013
Fewest league goals conceded in a season (Apertura/Clausura): 20 goals - Clausura 2013
Most points in a season (Apertura/Clausura): 30 points - Apertura 2013	
Most League wins in a season (Apertura/Clausura): 8 wins – Clausura 2013, Apertura 2013, Clausura 2014
Most League losses in a season (Apertura/Clausura): 12 losses – Clausura 2009
Most home League wins in a season:
Most away League wins in a season:

Internationals
Most international caps (total while at club): 6 caps - Oscar Ceren - El Salvador

Attendances
Highest home attendance: v A.D. Isidro Metapan, 1,647 (May 11, 2014)
Highest away attendance:

Other

Internationals
The following players represented their countries while playing for Juventud Independiente (the figure in brackets is the number of caps gained while a Juventud Independiente player. The asterisk on the end means they earned their caps while at Juventud Independiente.  Many of these players also gained caps while at other clubs. Figures for active players (in bold) last updated 2015.
  

El Salvador
 Óscar Cerén (6) *
 Darwin Cerén 
 Guillermo Castro
 Álex Erazo
 Cristian Esnal (2) *
 Fidel Mondragón
 Carlos Menjívar
 Herbert Sosa (1) * 
 Irvin Valdez (1) *
 David Rugamas (1) *
 Ramiro Carballo
 Ronald Pimentel

Trinidad & Tobago
Yohance Marshall

References

External links

Football in El Salvador